Defiance is Assemblage 23's third studio album, released through Metropolis Records and Accession Records in October 2002. The album contains the song "Document," released as a single prior to the release of Defiance. The album received high appraisal from electronic music magazine ReGen.

Track listing
All songs written, performed and produced by Tom Shear.

References

2002 albums
Assemblage 23 albums
Accession Records albums
Metropolis Records albums